This is a list of cities and towns in Angola.

Images

References

City Population: Angola

Bibliography 
  

Angola
 
Angola
Cities
Angola